Sitar, Iran is a village in Sistan and Baluchestan Province, Iran.

Sitar in Iran may also refer to:
 Sitar-e Abdol Rahim, Sistan and Baluchestan Province
 Sitar-e Ali, Sistan and Baluchestan Province
 Sitar-e Mahmud, Sistan and Baluchestan Province

See also
 Sitar (disambiguation)